Theresa Berg Andersen (née Kristensen, born 29 December 1979) is a Danish politician and member of the Folketing, the national legislature. A member of the Green Left party, she has represented North Jutland since November 2022. She was also a substitute member of the Folketing for Lisbeth Bech-Nielsen twice: between January 2020 and August 2020; and between December 2020 and August 2021.

Andersen was born on 29 December 1979 in Nibe. She is daughter of radio/TV electrical mechanic Jens Erik Kristensen and Vera E. Bundgaard. She studied social education at Ranum Seminarium (1999-2003) and has a Master of Arts degree in public management from the Aarhus University (2015). She was a supervisor at a day-care facilities in Vesthimmerland Municipality between 2004 and 2022. She was a member of the municipal council in Vesthimmerland from 2014 to 2022 and was first deputy mayor from 2021 in a Venstre led administration.

Andersen is married to Thomas Berg Andersen and has two children: Alberte (b. 2004) and Frida (b. 2005).

References

External links

1979 births
21st-century Danish women politicians
Aarhus University alumni
Danish municipal councillors
Living people
Members of the Folketing 2022–2026
People from Vesthimmerland Municipality
Socialist People's Party (Denmark) politicians
Women members of the Folketing